is a syllable in the Javanese script that represents the sound /bɔ/, /ba/. It is transliterated into Latin as "ba" and sometimes in Indonesian orthography as "bo". It has another form (pasangan), but is represented by a single Unicode code point, U+A9A7.

Pasangan 
Its pasangan form , is located on the bottom side of the previous syllable. For example,  - anak babi (piglet).

Murda 
The letter ꦧ has a murda form, which is ꦨ.

ꦧ with a cerek (ꦆ) is called letter I, while ꦇ is called long I.

Glyphs

Unicode block 

Javanese script was added to the Unicode Standard in October, 2009 with the release of version 5.2.

References 

Javanese script